Vrilletta is a genus of beetles in the family Ptinidae.

Species
These 10 species belong to the genus Vrilletta:
 Vrilletta blaisdelli Fall, 1905 i c g b
 Vrilletta californica Fisher, 1939 i c g
 Vrilletta convexa LeConte, 1874 i c g
 Vrilletta decorata Van Dyke, 1918 i c g b
 Vrilletta expansa LeConte, 1874 i c g
 Vrilletta fulvolineata (Pic, 1903) i c g
 Vrilletta laurentina Fall, 1905 i c g
 Vrilletta murrayi LeConte, 1874 i c g b
 Vrilletta nigra (Pic, 1905) i c g
 Vrilletta plumbea Fall, 1905 i c g
Data sources: i = ITIS, c = Catalogue of Life, g = GBIF, b = Bugguide.net

References

Ptinidae
Taxa named by John Lawrence LeConte
Beetles described in 1874